Yumatov is a Russian masculine surname, its feminine counterpart is Yumatova.

Notable people with surname 
Georgi Yumatov (1926–1997), Soviet film actor
Pavel Yumatov (born 1974), Russian football player

Russian-language surnames